No. 147 Squadron RAF was a Royal Air Force Squadron that was a transport unit in World War II.

History

Formation and World War II
Plans for formation of the squadron in World War I never came to fruition. It was formed on 17 October 1941 and deployed to Egypt as a bomber unit but was attached to other units due to a lack of aircraft and disbanded on 15 February 1943.

On 5 September 1944 it formed  as a Transport Command unit equipped with Douglas Dakotas. Avro Ansons were added and operated until the squadron disbanded on 13 September 1946. It reformed on 1 February 1953 as an overseas ferry unit moving aircraft such a Sabres and Hunters before final disbandment upon merger with No. 167 Squadron RAF on 15 September 1958.

Became the Ferry Squadron.

Aircraft operated

References

External links
 History of No.'s 146–150 Squadrons at RAF Web
 147 Squadron history on the official RAF website

147
Military units and formations established in 1918
1918 establishments in the United Kingdom
Squadron 147